Zschusschen is a surname. Notable people with the surname include:

Felitciano Zschusschen (born 1992), Dutch footballer
Guillermo Zschusschen (born 1985), Dutch footballer

See also
Enrique Zschuschen (born 1975), Aruban footballer